Genair Martins da Silva Junior (born December 26, 1983) is a Brazilian mixed martial artist who competed in Bellator Fighting Championships' featherweight division.

Biography

Early life and mixed martial arts career
Genair was born in Rio de Janeiro, Brazil. He is the son of a modest family and longtime resident of the Complexo do Alemão (German's Complex).

At 2003 he started practicing Luta Livre, training alongside Pedro Rizzo, Ebenezer Fontes Braga and others. At 2007 he began in Freestyle wrestling and quickly moved to MMA at 2008. In his first nine bouts, he fought mainly for organizations in his home state. At 2010 he won four straight bouts (achieving a record of 10–3) and subsequently signed with Bellator Fighting Championships.

Bellator Fighting Championships
Genair made his debut at Bellator 46 against Marlon Sandro in the quarterfinal match of the Bellator Fighting Championships: 2011 Summer Series Featherweight Tournament. He lost via split decision (30-27 Sandro, 29-28 Genair and 29-28 Sandro).

At Bellator 52, Genair faced Bryan Goldsby. On the day of the weight-ins for the fight, Genair did not make the 145 lb weight limit. The fighters have agreed to fight at a catchweight of 150 lb and Genair lost 20% of his purse. He won the bout via submission in the first round.

At Bellator 60, Genair was expected to face Alexandre Bezerra in the opening round of the Bellator Fighting Championships: Season Six Featherweight Tournament. However, once again he failed to make weight and instead faced Bobby Reardanz in a catchweight bout of 148 lb. He defeated Reardanz via TKO in the third round.

At Bellator 88, Genair faced Alexandre Bezerra in the opening round of the Bellator Fighting Championships: Season Eight Featherweight Tournament. He lost via submission in the first round.

Mixed martial arts record

|-
|Loss
|align=center|15–6
|Magomedrasul Khasbulaev
|KO (punch)
|WFCA 38
| 
|align=center|2
|align=center|4:00
|Grozny, Chechnya, Russia
|
|-
|Win
|align=center|15–5
|Gilbert Patrocinio
|KO (punches)
| FTF 12: Rizzo vs. Flores
| 
|align=center|1
|align=center|N/A
|Espírito Santo, Brazil
|
|-
|Win
|align=center|14–5
|Antônio Magno Lima Pereira
|Submission (arm-triangle choke)
| The Gladiator King
| 
|align=center|3
|align=center|1:10
| Rio de Janeiro, Brazil
|
|-
|Loss
|align=center|13–5
|Alexandre Bezerra
|Submission (armbar)
| Bellator 88
| 
|align=center|1
|align=center|1:40
| Duluth, Georgia, United States
|
|-
|Win
|align=center|13–4
|Bruno Leandro Soares
|Submission (arm-triangle choke)
|Sparta: MMA
|
|align=center|1
|align=center|3:26
|Itajaí, Santa Catarina, Brazil
|
|-
|Win
|align=center|12–4
|Bobby Reardanz
|TKO (leg kicks & punches)
|Bellator 60
|
|align=center|3
|align=center|0:51
|Hammond, Indiana, United States
|
|-
|Win
|align=center|11–4
|Bryan Goldsby
|Submission (D'arce choke)
|Bellator 52
|
|align=center|1
|align=center|3:51
|Lake Charles, Louisiana, United States
|
|-
|Loss
|align=center|10–4
|Marlon Sandro
|Decision (split)
|Bellator 46
|
|align=center|3
|align=center|5:00
|Hollywood, Florida, United States
|
|-
|Win
|align=center|10–3
|Adriano Gonçalves
|Decision (split)
|Capital Fight 3
|
|align=center|3
|align=center|5:00
|Brasília, Brazil
|
|-
|Win
|align=center|9–3
|Elias Souza
|Submission (guillotine choke)
|Juiz de Fora Fight: Evolution
|
|align=center|1
|align=center|3:18
|Juiz de Fora, Minas Gerais, Brazil
|
|-
|Win
|align=center|8–3
|Rafael Rodrigues
|TKO (punches)
|Nitrix: Champion Fight 5
|
|align=center|1
|align=center|3:18
|Balneário Camboriú, Santa Catarina, Brazil
|
|-
|Win
|align=center|7–3
|Iliarde Santos
|TKO (punches)
|Nitrix: Show Fight 4
|
|align=center|1
|align=center|2:32
|Balneário Camboriú, Santa Catarina, Brazil
|
|-
|Win
|align=center|6–3
|Rony Jason
|TKO (doctor stoppage)
|Platinum Fight Brazil 2
|
|align=center|2
|align=center|5:00
|Rio de Janeiro, Brazil
|
|-
|Loss
|align=center|5–3
|Eduardo Pachu
|TKO (doctor stoppage)
|Face to Face 2
|
|align=center|2
|align=center|2:51
|Rio de Janeiro, Brazil
|
|-
|Loss
|align=center|5–2
|Paulo Gonçalves Silva
|DQ (illegal knees to the head)
|Watch Out Combat Show 5
|
|align=center|1
|align=center|N/A
|Rio de Janeiro, Brazil
|
|-
|Win
|align=center|5–1
|André Luis de Oliveira
|Decision (unanimous)
|Watch Out Combat Show 5
|
|align=center|3
|align=center|5:00
|Rio de Janeiro, Brazil
|
|-
|Win
|align=center|4–1
|Alan Caster Guedes Araújo
|Decision (unanimous)
|Rio FC 2
|
|align=center|3
|align=center|N/A
|Rio de Janeiro, Brazil
|
|-
|Win
|align=center|3–1
|Flávio Serafim
|KO (knee)
|Iguaçu Fight
|
|align=center|1
|align=center|3:37
|Rio de Janeiro, Brazil
|
|-
|Loss
|align=center|2–1
|Vitor Toffanelli
|Decision (split)
|Fury FC: Fury Trials
|
|align=center|2
|align=center|5:00
|Rio de Janeiro, Brazil
|
|-
|Win
|align=center|2–0
|Bruno Amorim
|KO (punches)
|Fury FC: Fury Trials
|
|align=center|2
|align=center|0:16
|Rio de Janeiro, Brazil
|
|-
|Win
|align=center|1–0
|Ronaldo Silva
|TKO (punches)
|Federação de Kickboxing: Crazy Fight MMA
|
|align=center|1
|align=center|0:27
|São João de Meriti, Rio de Janeiro, Brazil
|

References

External links

1983 births
Living people
Featherweight mixed martial artists
Mixed martial artists utilizing Luta Livre
Brazilian male mixed martial artists
Sportspeople from Rio de Janeiro (city)